Grand Tower may refer to:

Places  
Grand Tower, Illinois
Grand Tower Island

Buildings and structures  
Grand Tower (Frankfurt am Main)
Grand Tower (Moscow)
Grand Tower Pipeline Bridge
The Shang Grand Tower